The Civil Mediation Council (CMC) is the recognised authority in England and Wales for all matters related to civil, commercial, workplace and other non-family mediation.  It is the first point of contact for the Government, the judiciary, the legal profession and industry on mediation issues. 

The CMC is a not for profit company limited by guarantee and operates as a charity. It has more than 400 members and provides major conferences and forums  

CMC operates an accreditation scheme for organisations that provide mediation services.  The Ministry of Justice has used the accreditation scheme as a mark of quality assurance.

Membership

General Member

Anyone with an interest in mediation can become a general member of the CMC, whether or not they are a mediator. Membership is also open to corporate and other bodies. The CMC provides information on mediation and also several training events throughout the year.

Registered Member

Registered membership is open to mediators and mediation providers. The main requirements for registration are:
successful completion of an assessed training course
current mediator experience
adherence to an acceptable ethical code (e.g. the EU Model Code of Conduct for Mediators)
professional indemnity insurance cover
continuing professional development
a published complaints procedure

Background
CMC was established in 2003 under the chairmanship of Lord Justice Sir Brian Neill .  It was created to be the neutral and independent body to represent and to promote civil and commercial mediation as alternatives to litigation and thereby to further law reform and access to justice for the general public. It followed an initiative by mediator and barrister Jonathan Dingle to build on unsuccessful attempts to provide a single unified voice for civil and commercial mediation in the United Kingdom.

On 11 December 2007, the CMC elected Gordon Slynn as its President and Lord Justice Henry Brooke as its Chairman.

References

Further reading
Dispute Resolution Commitment: 
http://www.justice.gov.uk/downloads/guidance/mediation/drc-may2011.pdf
Guidance notes on the Dispute Resolution Commitment http://www.justice.gov.uk/downloads/guidance/mediation/drc-guidance-may2011.pdf
MoJ consultation, “Solving disputes in the county courts: creating a simpler, quicker and more proportionate system - A consultation on reforming civil justice in England and Wales” http://www.justice.gov.uk/downloads/consultations/solving-disputes-county-courts.pdf
See, in particular section 3 (which sets out proposals relating to ADR).

Resolution of the European Parliament regarding the implementation of Directive 2008/52/EC on certain aspects of mediation in civil and commercial matters in member states, its impact on mediation and its take-up by the courts (13 September 2011): http://www.europarl.europa.eu/sides/getDoc.do?pubRef=-//EP//TEXT+TA+P7-TA-2011-0361+0+DOC+XML+V0//EN&language=EN.

UNCITRAL Conciliation Rules – UN Resolution 35/52 adopted by the General Assembly on 4 December 1980
http://www.uncitral.org/pdf/english/texts/arbitration/conc-rules/conc-rules-e.pdf

UNCITRAL Model Law on Conciliation – UN Resolution 57/18 adopted by the General Assembly on 24 January 2003
https://undocs.org/A/RES/57/18

EU Code of Conduct for Mediators adopted in July 2004
http://ec.europa.eu/civiljustice/adr/adr_ec_code_conduct_en.pdf

EU Mediation Directive – Directive 2008/52/EC of the European parliament and of the Council of 21 May 2008
http://eur-lex.europa.eu/LexUriServ/LexUriServ.do?uri=OJ:L:2008:136:0003:0008:En:PDF

Access to Justice Final Report by The Right Honourable The Lord Woolf, Master of the Rolls, July 1996
National Archives (UK)

Review of Civil Litigation Costs Final Report by The Right Honourable Lord Justice Jackson, December 2009
http://www.judiciary.gov.uk/NR/rdonlyres/8EB9F3F3-9C4A-4139-8A93-56F09672EB6A/0/jacksonfinalreport14011

HM Government ADR Pledge announced by the Lord Chancellor in March 2001
http://www.justice.gov.uk/publications/docs/alternative-dispute-resolution-08-09.pdf

Resolving Workplace Disputes - Department of Business Innovation & Skills, January 2011
http://www.bis.gov.uk/assets/biscore/employment-matters/docs/r/11-511-resolving-workplace-disputes-consultation.pdf

Solving disputes in the county courts – creating a simpler, quicker and more proportionate system: Ministry of Justice, March 2011
http://www.justice.gov.uk/consultations/docs/solving-disputes-county-courts.pdf

Mediation
Legal organisations based in England and Wales
Organizations established in 2003